A winterbourne is  a stream or river that is dry through the summer months, a special case of an intermittent stream. Winterbourne is a British term derived from the Old English winterburna, which is equivalent to winter + burna. A winterbourne is sometimes simply called a bourne, from the Anglo-Saxon word for a stream flowing from a spring, although this term can also be used for all-year water courses.

Winterbournes generally form in areas where there is chalk (or other porous rock) downland bordering clay valleys or vales.  When it rains, the porous chalk holds water in its aquifer, releasing the water at a steady rate.  During dry seasons the water table may fall below the level of the stream's bed, causing it to dry out.

Exploitation of chalk aquifers as a domestic water source in Britain has had the effect of converting many streams and rivers into artificial winterbournes. This effect is controversial, and local campaigns have often been successful in reducing aquifer abstraction and reversing the effect. For an example, see the River Pang in Berkshire.

Examples 
Winterbournes occasionally give their names to settlements. Many of the United Kingdom's 'Winterbournes' are villages in Dorset, such as Winterbourne Abbas, Winterborne Monkton, Winterborne St Martin, Winterborne Zelston, Winterborne Houghton and Winterborne Whitechurch. In north Wiltshire, north of Avebury, there are the villages of Winterbourne Monkton and Winterbourne Bassett, and in south Wiltshire, north-east of Salisbury, Winterbourne Dauntsey, Winterbourne Earls and Winterbourne Gunner. In South Gloucestershire there are the villages of Winterbourne and Winterbourne Down.

There is a winterbourne stream in a suburban area of Lewes, East Sussex. The area is also called Winterbourne. The stream runs from the foot of the South Downs through a park, a housing estate and a public garden, ending at the Railway Land Nature Reserve where it meets the River Ouse. It is a clear and verdant stream, much frequented by ducks. Another winterbourne stream is the River Lavant found In Chichester, West Sussex.

See also
 Places called Winterbourne
 Arroyo (creek)
 Chalk stream
 Intermittent and ephemeral streams
 Perennial stream, a stream or river that flows all year round
 Wadi
 Gypsey (spring), East Yorkshire name for a Winterbourne

References

Bodies of water
Dry or seasonal streams
Rivers
Rivers of England